According to Census 2011 information the location code or village code of Nilok village is 394407. Nilok, a village located in Bonth Block of Bhadrak district in Odisha, India. It is situated 28 km away from sub-district headquarter Bant and 28 km away from district headquarter Bhadrak. As per 2009 stats, Nilok is the gram panchayat of Nilok village.

The total geographical area of village is 149 hectares. As of 2011 India census, Nilok has a population of 1,119 (550 male and 569 female), with an effective literacy rate of 86.97%. There are about 256 houses in Nilok village. Bhadrak is nearest town to Nilok which is approximately 30 km away.

History 
The village is full of ponds from which more are of the Governments and also big. A pond which acquires 3 acres of land and called as Bada Pokhari. In Oriya, the meaning of the village is The place surrounded by oscens. But there is no oscen, only pons are available.
Nilok is famous for Makar Mela of Maa Baulasuni. there are so many kennels flows through the village. The people in this village mainly depends on the fields. Some have the Business. The nearby market is a small market where all the things are available. Every family have at least a bike and have a TV. There is the cable connection in the village, which helps all to watch the favorite channels in low price at home.

Connectivity of Nilok

Education facilities
The village has a Primary School,  High School, Sanskrit School and a Sishu Mandir.

Festivals celebrated in the village
There are many festivals celebrated in the village. In January Makar Mela  Raja, Rakshaya Bandhan, Ratha, Dola are the main festivals. Durga puja, Laxmi puja, Ganesh Puja and Saraswati puja are the festivals in the village.

Temples 
There are several Temples in the village.

References 

Villages in Bhadrak district